Chaenactis fremontii, with the common names Frémont's pincushion and desert pincushion, is a species of annual wildflower in the daisy family. Both the latter common name, and the specific epithet are chosen in honor of John C. Frémont.

Distribution and habitat
Chaenactis fremontii is native to the Southwestern United States and northern Baja California. It grows in sandy and gravelly soils in the deserts and low mountains, such as the Mojave Desert in  California and the Sonoran Desert habitats. It is found in California, Baja California, Arizona, Nevada, and southern Utah.

Description

They may branch to extend many tall, almost naked stems. The sparse leaves are somewhat fleshy and long and pointed. Atop each erect stem is an inflorescence bearing usually one but sometimes more flower heads, each with plentiful densely packed disc florets. There may be very large ray florets around the edge of the discoid head. The flowers are white or very light pink.

References

External links

Calflora Database: Chaenactis fremontii (Fremont pincushion)

fremontii
Flora of the Southwestern United States
Flora of California
Flora of Baja California
Flora of the California desert regions
Flora of the Sonoran Deserts
Natural history of the California chaparral and woodlands
Natural history of the Mojave Desert
Natural history of the Peninsular Ranges
Natural history of the Transverse Ranges
Plants described in 1883
Taxa named by Asa Gray
Flora without expected TNC conservation status